Season 2 of Satisfaction began airing on 2 December 2008, and ended on 3 February 2009. Satisfaction continued to air on Foxtel's Showcase channel, airing all 10 episodes for the 2nd season. Season 2 saw the arrival of new character Sean (Dustin Clare), and also the departure of Tippi (Bojana Novakovic).

Cast

Starring
Diana Glenn as Chloe
Kestie Morassi as Natalie
Bojana Novakovic as Tippi (Episode 1–4)
Peta Sergeant as Heather
Madeleine West as Mel
Dustin Clare as Sean (Episode 3–)
 Alison Whyte as Lauren

Guest Starring
Jacki Weaver as Gillian
Liam Hemsworth as Marc
Jez Constable as William

Special Guest
Benard Curry as Married Man

Episodes

Release
On 1 October 2009, Satisfaction season 2 was released on DVD, featuring, 10 episodes, and plenty of special features.

References
 http://www.ezydvd.com.au/item.zml/808104

2008 Australian television seasons
2009 Australian television seasons
Satisfaction (Australian TV series)